The Upamayo Dam (possibly from Quechua upa calm, silent; mute, mayu river) is a dam at Lake Junin, the largest lake entirely in Peru. It is located on the border of the Junín Region, Junín Province, Ondores District, and the Pasco Region, Pasco Province, Vicco District. 

The dam was erected in 1936. It is operated by Centromín Perú.

References

Dams in Peru
Buildings and structures in Junín Region
Buildings and structures in Pasco Region
Dams completed in 1936
Gravity dams